Microbacterium radiodurans is a Gram-positive, heterotrophic and strictly aerobic bacterium from the genus Microbacterium which has been isolated from the Gobi desert in China. Microbacterium radiodurans is resistant against UV radiation.

References

Further reading

External links
Type strain of Microbacterium radiodurans at BacDive -  the Bacterial Diversity Metadatabase

Bacteria described in 2010
radiodurans